Fysisk Format is a Norwegian record label specialising in the underground music scene of Oslo. The label was created in 2008 by Kristian Kallevik, with members from Okkultokrati, Årabrot, Aristillus (band) and Snöras also working there throughout the years. Fysisk Format has its headquarters in the basement of renowned underground record store Tiger Records in the centre of Oslo. They also distribute records for other labels under the name of Diger.

Artists
Agenda
Årabrot
Aristillus
Attan
Beachheads
Beglomeg
Bjørn Hatterud
Black Blood World
Blood Command
Conrad Schnitzler
Daufødt
Death Is Not Glamorous
Di Kjipe
Dominic
Duvel
Eskatol
Frøkedal & Familien
Furze
Golden Core
Haraball
Haust
Heave Blood & Die
Hilma Nikolaisen
Hope I Die Virgin
Human Error
HYMN
Ieatheartattacks
Insomniac Bears
Jagged Vision
Kaospilot
Killl
King Midas
Knuste Ruter
Kollwitz (band)
Korrupt
Kyrre Bjørkås
La Casa Fantom
Le Corbeau (band)
Leonov
Livstid
Manhattan Skyline
MoE
Moon Relay
Misty Range
NAG
Nernes/Skagen
Next Life
New World Vulture
Nils Bech
Obliteration
Okkultokrati
Ondt Blod
PRTLVX
Pow Pow
Quiritatio
Timeworn
Sex Judas feat. Ricky
Trist Pike
SIBIIR
Silver
Siste Dagers Helvete
Snöras
Spurv
Svarte Greiner
The Good the Bad & the Zugly
Vestindien

References

Norwegian independent record labels
Companies based in Oslo
Alternative rock record labels
Hardcore record labels
Punk record labels
Record labels established in 2008
Norwegian companies established in 2008